Cyclone Zorbas, or Medicane Zorbas, was the first officially documented Mediterranean tropical-like cyclone, or medicane, since Cyclone Numa in 2017. Zorbas originated as an extratropical cyclone in the eastern Mediterranean Sea. Warm sea surface temperatures allowed the system to quickly deepen and transition into a tropical cyclone.

Heavy rain and flash flooding from Zorbas killed 5 people in Tunisia. One person was killed and two were declared missing in Greece. The storm was estimated to have caused millions of dollars (2018 USD) in damages.

Meteorological history
A first outlook about the possible development of a shallow warm-core cyclone in the Mediterranean was issued by ESTOFEX on 25 September 2018, and a second extended outlook was issued on 26 September 2018. On 27 September 2018, an extratropical storm developed in the eastern Mediterranean Sea. Water temperatures of around  supported the storm's transition into a hybrid cyclone, with a warm thermal core in the center. The storm moved northeastward toward Greece, gradually intensifying and developing characteristics of a tropical cyclone. Early on 1 October, Zorbas emerged into the Aegean Sea, while accelerating northeastward. On 2 October, Zorbas moved over northwestern Turkey and dissipated. A cold wake was observed in the Mediterranean Sea, with sea surface temperatures dropping  along the track of Zorbas due to strong upwelling.

It is unknown who named the system Zorbas, but the name is officially recognized for a medicane by the Deutscher Wetterdienst.

Effects

Greece
An indoor basketball stadium in Artemida, Attica, sustained damage to its roof during the storm, forcing the postponement of a game. The neighborhoods surrounding the Profitis Ilias in Mikri Mantineia were left without electricity for over 20 days after extensive damage occurred to the power grid. Strong waves damaged seaside businesses and flooded streets in Kalamata, Messinia. Traffic along coastal roads from Kalamata to Filoxenia ceased during the storm. In Navarinou, floodwaters swept chairs, tables, and umbrellas from beach vendors onto roads. In Methoni, a coastal highway and boats were damaged by high surf. Power outages occurred in Methoni, Koroni and Finikounda; crews worked to restore electricity on 29 September. Electricity was cut in West Mani and Pylos.

The coastal village of Kiveri in Argolis, suffered severe damage as a result of strong waves from the storm and floodwaters from the overflowing Oxovrio river. A pier in the village's port suffered damage, and multiple ships sank there. Units from the Argos-Mykines municipality were dispatched to repair damage and clean up mud and debris that had been swept into the village. Several vessels sank offshore of Myloi. Severe agricultural losses occurred in the village of Skafidaki, with olives, pomegranates, oranges, and mandarins being the worst impacted. OSE lines in Mylos and Kiveri were damaged. Roadways were damaged throughout the municipality.

The second floor of the Salamina Health Center flooded in Salamina city on Salamis Island after heavy rainfall entered through the roof and walls. Furniture, medical tools, and other items were floating in the floodwaters.

Schools were closed in Karystos on 27 September. The Evripos bridge was closed on 26 September, and the Eretria-Oropos ferry was halted.

On the island of Euboea, two elderly people and a 27-year-old man went missing during the storm. Restaurants and houses were damaged by floodwaters. Firefighters answered at least 534 calls for assistance. One couple was washed away by a water current, however, they were rescued by firefighters. The Peloponnese was placed under a state of emergency.

Elsewhere

During its formative stages, the storm caused flash flooding in Tunisia and Libya. The Tunisian government pledged financial assistance to residents whose homes were damaged.

See also

Mediterranean tropical-like cyclone
Tropical cyclones in 2018
Tropical cyclones and climate change
Tropical Storm Rolf (2011) – the first tropical storm in the Mediterranean to be recognized by an international agency
Cyclone Qendresa (2014) – one of the strongest Mediterranean tropical cyclones ever recorded
Hurricane Leslie (2018) – a cyclone in the East Atlantic that impacted Portugal as an extratropical cyclone about two weeks after Zorbas affected Greece
Cyclone Ianos (2020) – another medicane that mainly affected Greece

References

External links

 Hellenic National Meteorological Service
 Northeast Atlantic and Mediterranean Imagery – NOAA
 
 

2018 in Greece
Mediterranean tropical-like cyclones
September 2018 events in Europe
October 2018 events in Europe
Tropical cyclones in 2018